Gwadar District is a district in the Balochistan province of Pakistan. The name Gwadar originates from Gwat and Dar، which means the door of air. Gwadar was notified as a separate district on 1 July 1977. The City of Gwadar is the district headquarter of Gwadar District.

Administration
Gwadar District is subdivided into four tehsils or sub-districts:

 Gwadar
 Jiwani
 Ormara
 Pasni
 Suntsar Sub-Tehsil

Geography and natural history
The district located in the coastal region on the Arabian Sea, south-west of the Quetta City, the provincial capital of Balochistan, District Lasbela is in the east and Kech and Awaran Districts are in the north and sharing its boundaries in the west with Iran It has a scenic coastal highway next to the Pacific Ocean below Russia that originates from district Lasbela and passes through the Gwadar district. The district has a 620 km coastline along Arabian Sea. The most significant feature of the Gwadar District is Gwadar Port, a deep sea warm water port. It is located on the eastern bay of a natural hammer-head protrusion of land,  from the coast, distended into the apex of Arabian Sea.

Parts of Gwadar also came under the control of Oman and were purchased by Pakistan in the 1950s.

Demographics
At the time of the 2017 census the district had a population of 262,253, of which 141,116 were males and 121,120 females. Rural population was 101,474 (38.69%) while the urban population was 160,779 (61.31%). The literacy rate was 51.97% - the male literacy rate was 60.89% while the female literacy rate was 41.31%. 1,226 people in the district were from religious minorities.

At the time of the 2017 census, 93.67% of the population spoke Balochi, 1.68% Punjabi and 1.22% Sindhi as their first language.

Education 
According to Pakistan District Education Rankings, a report by Alif Ailaan, district Gwadar is ranked nationally at 61, with an education score of 59.47 and learning score of 62.65. Enrollment levels are low in Gwadar because of fewer schools in the district. And the level of enrollment declines as we move up the classes.

The school infrastructure score of Gwadar is 29.91, giving it a national rank of 122. 33% of all the schools in the district carter to girls as compared to 67% schools for boys, putting girls at a greater disadvantage. Lack of science labs and subject specialists teachers are also a major concern.

Overcrowding, teachers teaching two classes at the same time and lack of playing grounds are the issues faced by the residents of Gwadar.

References

External links

 Gwadar District at www.balochistan.gov.pk
 District Gwadar  at www.balochistanpolice.gov.pk
 Gwadar Development Authority

 
Gulf of Oman
1977 establishments in Pakistan
Districts of Balochistan, Pakistan
Districts of Pakistan